Boronia zeteticorum is a species of small, semi-prostrate shrub that is endemic to a restricted part of the Northern Territory. It has hairy branches, leaves and flower parts, simple leaves and white flowers with the sepals longer and wider than the petals.

Description
Its branches, leaves and some flower parts are covered with sessile, star-like hairs. The sepals and petals enlarge as the fruit develops.

Taxonomy and naming
Boronia zeteticorum was first formally described in 2008 by Marco F. Duretto who published the description in the journal The Beagle: occasional papers of the Northern Territory Museum of Arts and Sciences. The specific epithet (zeteticorum) is derived from the ancient Greek word zetetikos meaning "disposed to search".

Distribution and habitat
This boronia is only known from the type specimens that were collected "in sandstone country" in the Nabarlek area.

References 

zeteticorum
Flora of the Northern Territory
Plants described in 2008
Taxa named by Marco Duretto